Djanet is a district in Djanet Province, Algeria. It was named after its capital, Djanet. It is the largest district of the province in population and in area.

Municipalities 
The district is further divided into 2 municipalities:
Djanet
Bordj El Houasse

See also 
 Sebiba

References